Karapınar, Kuyucak is a village in the District of Kuyucak, Aydın Province, Turkey. As of 2010 it had a population of 698 people.

References

Villages in Kuyucak District